Sunčana strana ulice is the second studio album of the rock band Azra, released through Jugoton in 1981 on double vinyl.

In a list of top 100 Yugoslav rock albums compiled by the Croatian edition of the Rolling Stone magazine in 2015, Sunčana strana ulice placed first among albums by Croatian artists and third overall.

Track listing
All music and lyrics written by Branimir Štulić, except track 11 lyrics by Mile Rupčić.

Personnel 
Azra
Branimir Štulić – Guitars, lead vocals
Mišo Hrnjak – Bass, lead vocals in track 20
Boris Leiner – Drums, lead vocals in tracks 6 and 14

Additional musicians
Miroslav Sedak-Benčić - Saxophone in tracks 2, 15 and 23
Franjo Vlahović - Trumpet and trombone in track 15
Nikola Santro - Trombone in track 15
Mladen Juričić - Harmonica in track 11
Tata, Truli - Backup vocals

Artwork
Davor Mindoljević – Design and cover art

Production
Branimir Štulić – Producer
Siniša Škarica - Executive producer
Recorded by Janko Mlinarić

References

 www.discogs.com

Azra albums
1981 albums
Jugoton albums